Nikola Dobrović (12 February 1897 – 11 January 1967) was a Serbian architect, teacher, and urban planner. Dobrović designed a number of buildings including the Yugoslav Ministry of Defence building, later destroyed during the 1999 NATO bombing of Yugoslavia.

Biography
Dobrović was born in the Hungarian city of Pécs, 1897. He got his degree in architecture in 1923 from the High Technical School in Prague. After gaining experience in prominent Prague architectural offices and in his own practice, he moved to Dubrovnik in the early nineteen-thirties with the radical, programmatic mission of bringing modern architecture to this small but historically very important city on the Dalmatian coast. He was invited in 1930 by Dubrovnik municipal conservator Kosta Strajnić, well known as the author of the first monographs on Josip Plečnik and the sculptor Ivan Meštrović, to explain to the authorities what modern architecture actually was. To depict in the local press the exemplary architecture that would be suited to the so-called new, modern Dubrovnik, Strajnić put forward Dobrović’s radical project for hotel-Kursalon on Pile, in close proximity to the most monumental part of the medieval city walls, as an alternative to the eclectic project by the Viennese architect Alfred Keller. As for Dobrović, although his project was never to be realized, his entrance to Dubrovnik was truly grand.

Notes

References

1897 births
1967 deaths
People from Pécs
Brutalist architects
Serbian architects
20th-century Serbian people
Austro-Hungarian emigrants to Yugoslavia
Austro-Hungarian Serbs